Onchidoris perlucea is a species of sea slug, a dorid nudibranch, a shell-less marine gastropod mollusc in the family Onchidorididae.

Distribution
This species was described from Taliarte, Gran Canaria, Canary Islands, North Atlantic Ocean.

References

Onchidorididae
Gastropods described in 2014